"Somewhere Between Ragged and Right" is a song recorded by American country music artists John Anderson and Waylon Jennings.  It was released in December 1987 as the first single from Anderson's album Blue Skies Again.  The song reached #23 on the Billboard Hot Country Singles & Tracks chart.  The song was written by Jennings and Roger Murrah.

Chart performance

References

1988 singles
1987 songs
John Anderson (musician) songs
Waylon Jennings songs
Songs written by Waylon Jennings
Songs written by Roger Murrah
Song recordings produced by Jimmy Bowen
MCA Records singles